Events during the year 1998 in Northern Ireland.

Incumbents
 First Minister - David Trimble (from 1 July)
 deputy First Minister - Seamus Mallon (from 1 July)
 Secretary of State - Mo Mowlam

Events
9 January - British Secretary of State for Northern Ireland, Mo Mowlam, visits loyalist prisoners in the Maze prison. Afterward loyalists agree to attend the Stormont talks.
20 February - Sinn Féin is excluded from the Northern Ireland talks for two weeks. Protests in Belfast follow.
10 April (Good Friday) - The British and Irish governments and all the political parties in the Northern Ireland (except the Democratic Unionist Party) sign the Belfast Agreement.
19 May - John Hume and David Trimble join U2 on stage in Belfast as they make a direct appeal to young voters in Northern Ireland to vote 'yes' in the referendum on the Good Friday Agreement.
22 May - The Belfast Agreement is endorsed in a referendum by people north and south of the border.
25 June - The people of Northern Ireland go to the polls to elect a new Assembly.
June - Crumlin Road Courthouse is closed and the site is eventually sold to a private developer.
1 July - The new Northern Ireland Assembly first meets, in "shadow" form; Reg Empey and Seamus Mallon are elected First Minister and deputy First Minister respectively.
12 July - Drumcree conflict: Three young children are killed in a loyalist Ulster Volunteer Force arson attack in Ballymoney.
15 August - Omagh bombing: 29 people die in a car bomb explosion near the centre of Omagh, County Tyrone, caused by the Real Irish Republican Army.
3 September - Bill Clinton, President of the United States, visits Omagh and views the bomb damage.
16 October - John Hume and David Trimble are announced as the winners of the Nobel Peace Prize.
6 November - David Trimble returns as First Minister in succession to Reg Empey.
10 December - John Hume and David Trimble are presented with the Nobel Peace Prize at a ceremony in Oslo, Norway.

Arts and literature
Malachi O'Doherty's study The Trouble With Guns: Republican Strategy and the Provisional IRA is published.

Sport

Football
Irish League
Winners: Cliftonville

Irish Cup
Winners: Glentoran 1 - 0 Glenavon (after extra time).

Motorcycling
Robert Dunlop wins the Ultra-Lightweight race at the Isle of Man TT.

Deaths
2 September - Jackie Blanchflower, footballer (b.1933).
13 November - Valerie Hobson, actress (b.1917).

Full date unknown
Sean McAloon, Uillean piper and pipe maker (b.1923).

See also
1998 in England
1998 in Scotland
1998 in Wales

References 

 
Northern Ireland